Kwahu District is a former district council that was located in Eastern Region, Ghana. Originally created as an ordinary district assembly in 1975. However, on 10 March 1989, it was split off into two new district assemblies: Kwahu South District (capital: Mpraeso) and Kwahu North District (capital: Donkorkrom). The district assembly was located in the northern part of Eastern Region and had Mpraeso as its capital town.

References

1989 disestablishments in Africa
Eastern Region (Ghana)
Former districts of Ghana
States and territories disestablished in 1989